NGC 3621 is a field spiral galaxy about  away in the equatorial constellation of Hydra. It is comparatively bright and can be well seen in moderate-sized telescopes. It shines with a luminosity equal to 13 billion times that of the Sun. The morphological classification is SA(s)d, which indicates this is an ordinary spiral with loosely wound arms. There is no evidence for a bulge. Although it appears to be isolated, NGC 3621 belongs to the Leo spur.

This galaxy has an active nucleus that matches a Seyfert 2 optical spectrum, suggesting that a low mass supermassive black hole is present at the core. Based upon the motion of stars in the nucleus, this object may have a mass of up to three million times the mass of the Sun.

Gallery

References

External links 

 A Picture-perfect Pure-disc Galaxy — ESO Photo release.

Unbarred spiral galaxies
Field galaxies
3621
Hydra (constellation)
034554